Kerfuś is a mascot of Carrefour store chain in Poland, in a form of a autonomous delivery robot distributing snacks, with a face of a cartoon cat. The mascot was introduced in the stores in Warsaw, Poland, in 2022, as a advertisement campaign in the collaboration between Carrefour and PepsiCo. Since then, it has become viral phenomenon and a meme in the internet.

Character description 
Kerfuś is a BellaBot autonomous delivery robot manufactured by Pudu Robotics, and distributed in Poland by LSI Software. It is used by Carrefour store chain, to distribute snacks to the customers in its stores, as part of its marketing campaign. It has a display that depicts a face of a cartoon cat, and can interact and talk with the customers. It is voiced by Hanna Rudzka-Jętczak.

History 
Kerfuś was introduced in the September 2022 by Carrefour in its two stores in Galeria Wileńska and Westfield Arkadia shopping centres in Warsaw, Poland, as part of its marketing campaign. The campaign itself was a collaboration between Carrefour and PepsiCo, as part of which, the robot distributed products of the latter to the costumers, including soda drinks and bags of crisps.

The robot had gained huge popularity, and became a viral phenomenon in the internet, including being featured in various memes and pornographic images.

As part of the collaboration with PepsiCo, the robot is present in the stores in Warsaw until the end of 2022. It remains unknown if the collaboration would be extended, however Carrefour representatives stated that the company is interested in continuing presence of Kerfuś in its store.

With the huge popularity of the robot, Carrefour organized a tour across Poland, with robot appearing in its stores in various cities. Those cities were: Bolesławiec, Bełchatów, Ciechanów, Dębica, Gdańsk, Gorzów Wielkopolski, Inowrocław, Kalisz, Mińsk Mazowiecki, Olsztyn, Ostrowiec Świętokrzyski, Poznań, Puławy, Tarnów, Toruń, and Wrocław. The company also has released a limited series of clothing with Kerfuś, available at its stores.

In December 2022, Carrefour, in the partnership with, and as a promotion of, the movie Cat Daddies, took part in the charity, collecting in its stores donated food and other things to help animals. Kerfuś had been used as a brand ambassador of the charity and the movie. It took place in the eight stores, in the cities of Gdańsk, Inowrocław, Ostrowiec Świętokrzyski, Puławy, Toruń, Warsaw, and Wrocław.

References 

Advertising characters
Mascots introduced in 2022
Individual robots
Food advertising characters
Cat mascots
Catgirls
Fictional cats
Corporate mascots
Fictional robots
Fictional robotic animals
Advertising campaigns
Fictional Polish people
Carrefour
PepsiCo advertising campaigns
Internet memes
Internet memes introduced in 2022
Furry fandom